Kanchikudicharu is a Tamil village in the Ampara District in the Eastern Province of Sri Lanka.

2007 military action by the Liberation Tigers of Tamil Eelam The area was controlled by the Sri Lankan state forces. Kanchikudiyaru is the last captured area in the Eastern Province under the control of the Liberation Tigers of Tamil Eelam (LTTE).

People were resettled here in 2015, with up to 190 families residing in the village.  Also land-based farming, livestock farming and milking are also livelihoods. Kanchikudicharu Tank is a biggest tank in this village.

Agriculture
Mainly involved in paddy cultivation , Animal husbandry and Home gardening

Education
Kanchikudiyaru Ganesha Vidyalayam

Religion
Everyone living here follows Shaivism.

Murugan Temple
Siddhivinayakar Temple
Thanthondri Maagaparameshwary Temple

See also
Eastern Theater of Eelam War IV
Seerpadar

References

Villages in Ampara District
Thirukkovil DS Division